Love in the Afternoon is a short-lived game show, presented by Antoine de Caunes, Carolyn Marshall and Maria McErlane, which ran for only one series and 16 episodes from 30 October 1995 to 14 February 1996.

References

1995 British television series debuts
1996 British television series endings
Channel 4 game shows
1990s British game shows
Television game shows with incorrect disambiguation